A parent is a caretaker of offspring in their own species, such as a mother or father.

Parent or parents may also refer to:

Places
Parent, Minnesota, an unincorporated community in Benton County, in the United States
Parent, Puy-de-Dôme, a commune of the Puy-de-Dôme département, in France
Parent, Quebec, a community within the city of La Tuque, Quebec, in Canada
Parent railway station, a Via Rail station in the community

Entertainment and publishing
Parents (magazine), a magazine about child development
"Parents", a rock song by Budgie from the 1973 album Never Turn Your Back on a Friend

Film and TV
Parents (1989 film), horror film
Parents (2007 film), Icelandic film
Parents (2016 film), Danish film
Parents (TV series), 2012 British sitcom on Sky1
"Parents" (House), episode of the American television series House
"Parents" (Up All Night), episode of the American television series Up All Night
"The Parents", episode of the American television series Smash

People
Parent (surname), list of people named Parent

Other uses
Parent bug, Elasmucha grisea, a shield bug
Parent chain, in organic chemistry, an unbranched compound
Parent company, a company that owns enough voting stock to control another firm
 Parent drug, similar to metabolites of drugs
Parent node, a node directly connected to another node in a tree data structure
Parent peak, a mountain of higher elevation connected to another peak

See also